Eleazer Ellis represented Dedham, Massachusetts in the Great and General Court. Beginning in 1729, he served two terms as selectman.

References

Works cited

Members of the colonial Massachusetts General Court from Dedham
Year of birth missing
Year of death missing
Dedham, Massachusetts selectmen